M. Elizabeth Graue is Sorenson professor of Curriculum and Instruction, in the School of Education at the University of Wisconsin–Madison. She is the former Associate Director for Faculty, Staff, and Student Development at the Wisconsin Center for Education Research. Graue’s areas of interest include school readiness, class size reduction, preK policy, preparing teachers for inclusive home-school relations, and qualitative research methods.

She is part of a team of researchers developing and implementing developmentally and culturally responsive practices in early math and is collaborating with Sharon Ryan on a study of the translation of preK policy to children's experience.

Awards and honors
Outstanding mentor, Women's faculty mentoring, University of Wisconsin Madison
American Educational Research Association Member at large.
American Educational Research Association Fellow
Vilas Associates Award, University of Wisconsin–Madison Graduate School, 2006-8, Outstanding reviewer, Educational Researcher , 2003, 2006
American Educational Research Association Division D & Special Interest Group on Qualitative Research  Outstanding Dissertation Using Qualitative Methodology, 1990;
American Educational Research Association Early Education/Child Development Special Interest Group Outstanding Dissertation Award, 1990.

Books
Trainor, A. & Graue, M.E. (2013). Reviewing Qualitative Research in the Social Sciences .  Routledge.
Graue, M.E. & Walsh, Daniel J. (1998).  Studying Children in Context: Theories, Methods, and Ethics.  Thousand Oaks: Sage Publications (1998). 
Graue, M.E. (1993).  Ready for What?  Constructing Meanings of Readiness for Kindergarten.  Albany, NY:  State University of New York Press (1992).

References

20th-century American academics
20th-century American non-fiction writers
20th-century American women educators
20th-century American educators
21st-century American academics
21st-century American non-fiction writers
21st-century American women educators
21st-century American educators
American psychology writers
American women academics
American women non-fiction writers
Living people
University of Wisconsin–Madison faculty
Year of birth missing (living people)